The Lorenzo Bandini Trophy is an annual award honouring an individual or team for their achievements in Formula One motor racing. The accolade's trophy, a ceramic replica of Bandini's Ferrari 312/67 car adorned with the number 18 created by the ceramist Goffredo Gaeta, is awarded for "a commendable performance in motorsport". This is not based on race results, but on how the success was achieved, as well as the recipient's character and approach to racing. Each recipient is honoured for their achievements over the course of the previous year. The recipient is selected by a panel of 12 judges composed of motor racing journalists and former Formula One team members. Previously, the winner was decided by a vote from the residents of Brisighella. The winner is honoured at a ceremony in Bandini's home town of Brisighella in Emilia-Romagna, and the trophy is presented by the Associazione Trofeo Lorenzo Bandini.

In the motor racing world, the accolade is considered highly prestigious. Ivan Capelli, an Italian driver, was the inaugural winner in 1992. No award was given in each of 1993 and 1994 and no-one has won more than once because drivers are only allowed to be a named a recipient just once to give other racers the opportunity to win it. Although the accolade is usually awarded to racing drivers for their achievements from the previous season, it has been awarded to two racing team members: the Ferrari president Luca Cordero di Montezemolo (1997), and the marque's vice-chairman Piero Ferrari (2013). The accolade has been given to two racing teams: the Mercedes AMG Petronas F1 Team for winning the World Constructors' Championship with a V6 engine coupled with hybrid technology (2015), and Scuderia Ferrari to commemorate the 70th anniversary of its establishment (2017). It has been presented to Italian drivers and teams eight times, German competitors and constructors four times and three times to British racers. The 2022 winner was the Haas F1 driver Kevin Magnussen.

Winners

Statistics

See also
 Hawthorn Memorial Trophy

Notes

References

External links
 

Auto racing trophies and awards
Awards established in 1992